Lyonetia leurodes is a moth in the  family Lyonetiidae. It is known from Namunukula, Sri Lanka.

This species has a wingspan of 7 mm and is ochreous-bronzy grey.

References

Lyonetiidae